Point Pleasant Historic District may refer to:

Point Pleasant Historic District (Point Pleasant, Pennsylvania), listed on the National Register of Historic Places in Bucks County, Pennsylvania
Point Pleasant Historic District (Point Pleasant, West Virginia), listed on the National Register of Historic Places in Mason County, West Virginia

See also
Point Pleasant (disambiguation)